Rats and Cats is a 2007 Australian comedy film directed by Tony Rogers and starring Adam Zwar and Jason Gann.

External links

Rats and Cats at At the Movies
Rats and Cats at SBS
Rats and Cats at Sydney Morning Herald

Australian comedy films
2007 films
2000s English-language films
2000s Australian films